Dolfin de Lowther (born c.1120) was an English nobleman descended from Danelaw Viking conquerors who in 1150, founded a settlement by the River Lowther that would eventually become the site of the still-standing Lowther Castle, which has since become a tourist attraction. The name Lowther is attributed to the Old Norse words of lauðr + á, meaning "foamy river".

Marriage and Issue
He married and had one son, Hamon de Lowther, who was recorded in a document from Durham dated 21 November 1202, containing information regarding the 'land of Hamon son of Dolfin'.

References 

12th-century English nobility
Lowther family
1120 births
Year of death unknown